The Josiah Bronson House is a historic house on Breakneck Hill Road in Middlebury, Connecticut.  Built about 1738, it is one of the town's few surviving 18th-century houses, and a good example of residential architecture from that period.   The house was listed on the National Register of Historic Places in 1982.

Description and history
The Josiah Bronson House is located northeast of the village center of Middlebury, in a rural-suburban setting on the north side of Breakneck Hill Road.  It is a -story wood-frame structure, with a gabled roof, central chimney, and clapboarded exterior.  Its main facade is five bays wide, with a symmetrical arrangement of windows around its main entrance. The entrance is unusually wide, with flanking sidelight windows; it was at one time sheltered by a wide portico.  The house is only one room deep, suggesting that it was originally built with a leanto section in the rear.  Sometime in the 19th century, the leanto was probably removed and replaced by the present two-story kitchen.  The interior retains a significant amount of original woodwork, as altered about 1800 to add some Federal details.  To the rear of the house there are two barns, of 19th-century or earlier construction.

The house was probably built about 1738 by Josiah Bronson, whose family was among the first to settle the Breakneck Hill area. The French Army commandeered by the Marquis de Lafayette is known to have camped in the area during the American Revolutionary War in 1781 and 1782, due in part to the notoriously steep hill.

See also 
March Route of Rochambeau's army
List of historic sites preserved along Rochambeau's route
National Register of Historic Places listings in New Haven County, Connecticut

References

Houses on the National Register of Historic Places in Connecticut
Houses completed in 1738
Middlebury, Connecticut
Houses in New Haven County, Connecticut
Historic places on the Washington–Rochambeau Revolutionary Route
National Register of Historic Places in New Haven County, Connecticut